Tidung Island is one of the villages in the South Thousand Islands sub-district, Kepulauan Seribu Regency, Jakarta, Indonesia.

References

Thousand Islands Regency
Administrative villages in Jakarta